James Edmond Macdonnell (3 November 1917 – 13 September 2002) was an Australian novelist. The covers of his novels declare him "Australia's leading novelist of the Navy" and "Australia's greatest novelist of the sea".

Biography
James Edmond Macdonnell was born in 1917 in Mackay, Queensland and became one of Australia's most prolific writers of paperback novels. As a boy, he became determined to go to sea and read every seafaring book he could find. At age 13, while his family was still asleep, he took his brother's bike and rode some 80 miles from his home town to Brisbane in an attempt to see ships and the sea. Fortunately, he was found and returned to his family. He attended the Toowoomba Grammar School from 1931 to 1932. He served in the Royal Australian Navy for fourteen years, joining at age 17, advancing through all lower deck ranks and reaching the rank of commissioned gunnery officer. He began writing books while still in active service. The publicity biography on the back cover of Command! (1959) states that "he began with novels in 1942".

Macdonnell wrote stories for The Bulletin under the pseudonym "Macnell" and from 1948 to 1956 he was a member of The Bulletin staff. His first book, Fleet Destroyer – a collection of stories about life on the small ships – was published by The Book Depot, Melbourne, in 1945. Macdonnell began writing full-time for Horwitz in 1956, writing an average of a dozen books a year.

After leaving the navy, Macdonnell lived in St. Ives, Sydney and pursued his writing career. In 1988, he retired to Buderim on the Sunshine Coast in Queensland. He died peacefully in his sleep at a Buderim hospital in 2002. He is survived by his wife Valerie and his children Beth, Jane and Peter.

The Bulletin

Macdonnell's work for The Bulletin, using the pseudonym Macnell, includes the following:

Publishers

The Book Depot
Ace Books
Constable & Co. Ltd.
Continental Printing Co. Ltd. (Hong Kong)
Corgi Books
Dent (London)
Flammarion (France)
Horwitz Publications
Signet Books
The Children's Press

Works

J. E. Macdonnell wrote over 200 novels, in at least 7 different series under several versions of his own name and several pseudonyms:

J. E. Macdonnell
James Edmond Macdonnell
James Macdonnell
J.E.M.
Jim Macdonnell
J. Macdonnell
James Macnell
James Dark
Kerry Mitchell
Michael Owen.

James Dark was a Horwitz house pseudonym shared by several authors.  Some believe that he may have written as James Workman, another Horwitz house pseudonym, as well. Macdonnell's work has been published in at least nine different languages.

Characters
Macdonnell's naval stories feature several recurring characters:

Captain "Dutchy" Holland, D.S.O.
Captain Peter Bentley, V.C.
Captain Bruce Sainsbury, V.C.
Jim Brady.
 XO Lieutenant Commander Robert Randall

Several books follow Jim Brady through the ranks from Able Seaman to Captain.

Recurring characters in other series include Commander Carton, a "tough, enterprising skipper" in the Crime Series, Mark Hood, an international spy, in the International Espionage series and Captain Mettle, V.C. in the three juvenile novels.

Series

Since J. E. Macdonnell wrote so many books, many of which were released numerous times in different guises, in different collections and in various countries, it is difficult to identify every published series but some can be clearly identified: 

J. E. Macdonnell Series.
The Horwitz Australian Library.
The Horwitz Sea Adventure Library or Horwitz Naval Series.
The Classics Series.
The Collector's Series.
The Juvenile Books.
The Medical Series.
The Commander Carton Crime Series by Horwitz.
The International Espionage Series.

The Collector's Series, and the Classics Series both comprise 141 books, with 2 differences between them other than the title sequence. The Collector's Series does not contain the book The Captain and the classic series does not contain the book Don't Gimme The Ships. Both of these series comprise books from the original Sea Adventure Series.

The Juvenile Books
Macdonnell wrote three juvenile works about the character Captain Mettle using the pseudonym James Macnell. They were published by Constable and The Children's Press.
He wrote another entitled Colt and Co in the Valley of Gold as J. Macdonnell, which was published by Dent in 1960. This book was described in the wrapper notes as "the first of a new series" but no further titles were forthcoming.

Mettle at Woomera was re-released in paperback as Weapon Raid by Horwitz in 1979, using the name J. E. Macdonnell.

The Commander Carton Crime Series
Commander Carton is a retired R.N. captain who finds himself fighting crime.

The Horwitz Naval Series

Published as J. E. Macdonnell.

The Classics Series
The classics series is a re-release of most titles from the Horwitz Naval Series. The covers were mainly coloured silver and as a result this series is also known as the silver series.

The Collector's Series
The collector's series is another re-release of most titles from the Horwitz Naval Series. The covers were mainly coloured gold and as a result this series is also known as the gold series.

The International Espionage Series

This series was first published in America by Signet under the pseudonym James Dark. It was later published in Australia by Horwitz Publications as J. E. Macdonnell and some titles were changed. Additional titles were used for some non-English language versions, as well. The year shown reflects the original American year of publication. Australian titles are shown only where they differ.

The Medical Series

This series was published by Horwitz Publications under the name J. E. Macdonnell. At least some titles were published as part of the J. E. Macdonnell Series, along with other Macdonnell titles. They were also released as a separate series numbered MS1 – MS12. At least two titles were published under the pseudonym Kerry Mitchell. Macdonnell may have written other medical romance novels released by Horwitz under the name Kerry Mitchell, as well. The back cover of one edition says of Macdonnell, in part, "...In researching for this series of medical novels, he has witnessed more than fifty major surgical operations – and only fainted once...!"

Notes 

2. Commander Brady, Published by Constable 1956, Reprinted 1956, Corgi Books 1957, Re-issued 1971. Although this book is credited with J.E. Macdonnell as writer. The style of writing does not seem to be his.

References 

20th-century Australian novelists
Australian male novelists
1917 births
2002 deaths
20th-century Australian male writers
Royal Australian Navy officers